Giannis Sourdis (born 29 September 2001) is a Greek professional footballer who plays as a goalkeeper for Super League 2 club Panathinaikos B.

References

2001 births
Living people
Footballers from Athens
Association football goalkeepers
Greek footballers
Greece youth international footballers
Greek expatriate footballers
Serie A players
Serie D players
Super League Greece 2 players
Watford F.C. players
Udinese Calcio players
A.S.D. Cjarlins Muzane players
Rimini F.C. 1912 players
Panathinaikos F.C. B players
Expatriate footballers in Italy
Expatriate footballers in England
Greek expatriate sportspeople in England
Greek expatriate sportspeople in Italy